Hillbrow is an inner city residential neighbourhood of Johannesburg, Gauteng Province, South Africa. It is known for its high levels of population density, unemployment, poverty, prostitution and crime.

In the 1970s it was an Apartheid-designated "whites only" area but soon became a "grey area", where people of different ethnicities lived together. It acquired a cosmopolitan and politically progressive feel, and was one of the first identifiable gay and lesbian areas in urban South Africa. However, due to the mass growth of the population of poor and unemployed people after the end of Apartheid, crime soared and the streets became strewn with rubbish.  This, together with lack of investment and fear led to an exodus of middle-class residents in the 1980s and the decay of major buildings, leaving in its wake an urban slum by the 1990s.

Today, the majority of the residents are incoming migrants from the townships, rural areas and the rest of Africa, many living in abject poverty. An urban regeneration programme is underway. There are street markets, mainly used by local residents, and the Johannesburg Art Gallery contains work by major local artists including William Kentridge.

History
Prior to the discovery of gold on the Witwatersrand in 1886, the suburb laid on government owned land called Randjeslaagte that now makes up the Johannesburg CBD. It was a triangular shaped piece of waste land not used for farming and the future suburb lies in the northern apex of the triangle. The origin of its name is simple, the suburb lies on the brow of the east west mountain ridge that crosses the Johannesburg CBD. The land was owned as claims by J. Nicholls who sold them to Transvaal Mortgage, Loan & Finance Company. It was laid out as a residential suburb during 1894 and 1895, with Richard Currie auctioning the stands. In 1897 it became part of Johannesburg's Sanitary Board. After World War Two, developers started purchasing the stands at values beyond their worth and eventually turned it into blocks of flats.

Gay community
In the mid-20th century, Hillbrow developed a reputation for its growing gay community. Many gay establishments and publications were founded in Hillbrow from the 1960s forward. The gay community was strong and large enough in Hillbrow that the conservative ruling National Party, which instituted apartheid, fielded a pro-gay rights candidate, Leon de Beer, in the 1987 elections. De Beer's victorious campaign was heavily advertised in the Hillbrow-based gay publication Exit and his campaign promises were to both advance gay rights in parliament and reinstate Hillbrow as a whites-only district. His campaign garnered enough support from the gay community that he won the election, becoming the first elected official in South Africa to run and win on a pro-gay platform.

In 1990, one of the first training and information centres for HIV in South Africa was established in Hillbrow, initially catering mainly to white gay men. As the racial demographic in Hillbrow radically shifted, so too did the people in need of HIV-related care, and by the late 1990s the clinics mainly worked with black heterosexual women. Hillbrow experienced a heavy decline and most of the gay community, which was predominantly white, left the area within the decade.

In media and fiction 
In 2000, Michael Hammon and Jacqueline Görgen directed a documentary named Hillbrow Kids, depicting the struggles of a group of street children in post-apartheid urban South Africa. The 2001 novel Welcome to Our Hillbrow by Phaswane Mpe deals with life in the district in the years after apartheid, focusing on a large number of issues ranging from poverty, HIV/AIDS, and xenophobia.

Hillbrow has also been a setting used by other South African writers: in the 2001 novel, The Restless Supermarket, Ivan Vladislavić comically portrays South Africa's transition to democracy, endowing his narrator, Aubrey Tearle, with the perspective of a conservative white pensioner.  Through this lens, Hillbrow becomes representative of the larger post-apartheid South African nation.

In 2007, BBC Two reporter Louis Theroux ran a documentary called Law and Disorder in Johannesburg. The documentary depicted the state of complete abandon and lawlessness in some parts of the city, specifically in Hillbrow.

Much of Lauren Beukes' 2010 science fiction novel Zoo City was set in Hillbrow.

In January 2013, Al Jazeera English aired a Witness documentary about Hillbrow described as "A personal journey to Hillbrow, where human spirit, hope and enterprise triumph in this crime-ridden melting pot in the heart of South Africa."

The House Group
In 1990 Jean du Plessis and Adele du Plessis founded The House Group, an organization with several shelters and programs aimed at retrieving and rehabilitating female child victims of commercial sexual exploitation. The organization's first address in Hillbrow was on 52 Soper Road, close to Ponte City. In 1993 they moved to two adjacent premises on 60 Olivia Road (at the foot of the Hillbrow Tower) where the organization had The House Drop-in Centre and Intombi Shelter.
 
At the time, in South Africa, there was no legislation allowing The House Group to conduct its mission. Legislation was in effect to help male children, but no legislation allowed for girls in shelters. The lack of a legislative framework disallowed The House Group to continue and authorities tried to shut them down. The founders appealed to the media for help. A barrage of media attention followed that rallied public support and gained international attention. According to The House Group, hundreds of print articles and television exposes occurred over several years.

During 1996, The House Group was invited to deliver papers to the 1st World Congress Against Commercial Sexual Exploitation of Children, held in Stockholm, Sweden. A hundred and fifty countries were represented at the meeting. The organization enjoyed goodwill and sponsorship from foreign governments, most notable the Royal Dutch Government and that of the US.

During 1997, the Gauteng Provincial Government proclaimed the first legislation that allowed shelters for female children. Jean du Plessis and Adele du Plessis had worked with the ministry over many years to that effect. Subsequent to 1996, hundreds of shelters and programs similar to The House Group sprouted in South Africa. The problem with children and youth victims of commercial sexual exploitation in South Africa, and Hillbrow in particular, is on the increase.

Landmarks

Constitution Hill 
The Constitution Hill precinct, seat of the Constitutional Court of South Africa, is located on the western edge of Hillbrow, and is part of a major government and private sector initiative to revitalize the area and the rest of the CBD.

Hillbrow Tower 
The Hillbrow Tower, a telecommunication tower, dominates the Johannesburg city skyline, featured in many picture postcard views of the city. It has become a symbol of the city and appears in the city seal. Completed in 1971, it rises to a height of 270 metres, thus making it the tallest man-made structure with a lift in Africa. Initially named the JG Strijdom Tower, it became popularly known simply as the Hillbrow tower, and in May 2005 it was renamed to Telkom Joburg Tower, with its new name displayed prominently in lights. It once featured a luxury rotating restaurant, but that was closed in 1981 due to security fears and is unlikely to be reopened.

Ponte City 
Ponte City is the tallest residential building in Johannesburg and one of the city's most striking urban landmarks. It was designed by architect Rodney Grosskopff (who also designed other South African landmarks such as the Johannesburg Civic Theatre) and completed in 1975.

The building is distinct due both to its height, rising to 54 storeys above one of the highest points in Johannesburg, as well as its cylindrical shape. During its prime, Ponte City was one of the city's most sought-after addresses, but with inner-city urban decay setting in, it has become run-down, over-populated, and unsafe. The building was placed under new management in 1999, and with regular maintenance reinstated and gradual restoration, coupled with council, provincial, and government initiatives to rehabilitate Hillbrow, it began to find some shine again.

In February 2007, Danny Boyle, the British director of Trainspotting, announced plans to use the building as a film set in a future release.

Books and publications 
 Daniel Conway (2009), "Queering Apartheid: the National Party's 1987 'Gay Rights' Election Campaign in Hillbrow", Journal of Southern African Studies, 35,4: 849–863.
 Glynn Griffiths and Paddy Clay, Hillbrow (Cape Town: Don Nelson, 1982)
 Kgebetli Moele, Room 207 (Kwela Books, 2006)
 Alan Morris, Bleakness and Light: Inner City Transition in Hillbrow, Johannesburg (Johannesburg: University of Witwatersrand Press, 1999)
 Phaswane Mpe, Welcome to Our Hillbrow (Pietermaritzburg: University of KwaZulu-Natal Press, 2001)
 Ivan Vladislavic, The Restless Supermarket (Cape Town: David Philip, 2001)

Music 
 Hillbrow by Johannes Kerkorrel, from the album Eet Kreef (Shifty Records, 1989).
 Hillbrow by Stef Bos, from the album Jy vir My.
 Hillbrow by Manfred Mann's Earth Band, from the CD box Odds & Sods – Mis-takes & Out-takes

Notable people
 

Bonaventure Hinwood (1930–2016), Roman Catholic priest and Afrikaans poet

See also
Jerusalema – 2008 South African film portraying life in Hillbrow

References

External links

 Hillbrow Tower
 www.thehousegroup.org

Hillbrow
Urban decay in South Africa
Red-light districts in South Africa